Nenad Živković (born 10 March 1989) is a Serbian football forward.

References

External links
 

 Nenad Živković stats at utakmica.rs
 Nenad Živković stats at footballdatabase.eu

1989 births
Living people
Footballers from Belgrade
Association football forwards
Serbian footballers
FK Teleoptik players
FK Palilulac Beograd players
FK Srem players
FK BSK Borča players
FK Kolubara players
FK Bežanija players
FK Jedinstvo Užice players
FK Sinđelić Beograd players
Serbian First League players
Serbian SuperLiga players
J3 League players
Japan Football League players
Kagoshima United FC players
Serbian expatriate footballers
Expatriate footballers in Japan